HMS Fermoy was a Hunt-class minesweeper of the Aberdare sub-class built for the Royal Navy during World War I. She was not finished in time to participate in the First World War, and was crippled by German bombers in 1941 and later scrapped.

Design and description
The Aberdare sub-class were enlarged versions of the original Hunt-class ships with a more powerful armament. The ships displaced  at normal load. The ships' complement consisted of 74 officers and ratings.

The ships had two vertical triple-expansion steam engines, each driving one shaft, using steam provided by two Yarrow boilers.

The Aberdare sub-class was armed with a quick-firing (QF)  gun forward of the bridge and a QF twelve-pounder (76.2 mm) anti-aircraft gun aft. Some ships were fitted with six- or three-pounder guns in lieu of the twelve-pounder.

Construction and career
HMS Fermoy was built by the Dundee Shipbuilding Company. By 1923 she had become the depot ship for the Submarine Periscope School at Portland and on 14 April Hugh Marrack was appointed in command.

She was bombed by Italian aircraft off Valletta, Malta, on 30 April 1941, then on 4 May 1941, and was written off as constructive total loss.  She was eventually raised and sold for scrap.

See also
Fermoy, County Cork, Ireland

References

Bibliography
 
 
 

 

Hunt-class minesweepers (1916)
Royal Navy ship names
Ships built in Dundee
1919 ships
Maritime incidents in April 1941
Minesweepers sunk by aircraft
Ships sunk by Italian aircraft